LNER Class A3 4472 Flying Scotsman is a 4-6-2 Pacific steam locomotive built in 1923 for the London and North Eastern Railway (LNER) at Doncaster Works to a design of Nigel Gresley. It was employed on long-distance express East Coast Main Line trains by the LNER and its successors, British Railways Eastern and North-Eastern Regions, notably on the London to Edinburgh Flying Scotsman train service after which it was named.

The locomotive set two world records for steam traction, becoming the first steam locomotive to be officially authenticated as reaching  on 30 November 1934, and then setting a record for the longest non-stop run by a steam locomotive when it ran  on 8 August 1989 while in Australia.

Retired from revenue service in early 1963 after covering 2.08 million miles, The Flying Scotsman went under considerable fame in preservation under the ownership of, successively, Alan Pegler, William McAlpine, Tony Marchington, and finally the National Railway Museum (NRM).

As well as hauling enthusiast specials in the United Kingdom, the locomotive toured extensively in the United States and Canada from 1969 until 1973 and Australia in 1988 and 1989. Flying Scotsman has been described as the world's most famous steam locomotive.

History

Flying Scotsman is a 4-6-2 "Pacific" locomotive completed in February 1923 at Doncaster Works as the third of 51 Class A1 locomotives built to a design by Nigel Gresley. The A1s were designed for main line and later express passenger services, initially on the Great Northern Railway (GNR), a constituent company of the London and North Eastern Railway (LNER) after the amalgamation of 1923, for which they became a standard design. Flying Scotsman cost £7,944 to build, and initially carried the number 1472 as the GNR had not yet decided on a system-wide numbering scheme. Following amalgamation, in February 1924 the locomotive acquired its name after The Flying Scotsman express service between London King's Cross and Edinburgh Waverley, and assigned a new number, 4472.

Flying Scotsman became a flagship locomotive for the LNER, representing the company at the British Empire Exhibition at Wembley Park in 1924 and 1925. In 1928, the LNER decided to make The Flying Scotsman a non-stop service for the first time. 4472 became one of five A1s selected for the service, and hauled the inaugural service on 1 May where it completed the journey in 8 hours and 3 minutes. For this, the locomotives ran with an upgraded tender which held nine long tons of coal and fitted with a corridor connection, so a change of driver and fireman could take place while the train is moving. By replenishing water from the water trough system several times en route, these modifications allowed the A1s to travel the  without stopping. Flying Scotsman ran with its corridor tender until October 1936, after which it reverted to the original type. In 1938, it was paired with a streamlined non-corridor tender, and ran with this type until its withdrawal in 1963.

On 30 November 1934, Flying Scotsman became the first steam locomotive to reach the officially authenticated speed of  while hauling a light test train. It earned a place in the land speed record for railed vehicles, and the publicity-conscious LNER made much of the fact. Although the Great Western Railway's 3700 Class 3440 City of Truro was reported to have reached the same speed in 1904, the record was not official.

In 1928, Gresley began to modify the A1s into an improved version, the Class A3. Flying Scotsman emerged as an A3 on 4 January 1947. Its old 180 psi boiler was replaced with a 225 psi version with the long "banjo" dome of the type it carries today, and was fitted with more efficient valves and cylinders. In December 1958, it was fitted with a double Kylchap chimney to improve performance and economy, but it caused soft exhaust and smoke drift that tended to obscure the driver's forward vision; the remedy was found in the German-type smoke deflectors fitted at the end of 1961.

Following the success of Gresley's streamlined Class A4s, Flying Scotsman was no longer the LNER's flagship engine and was relegated to lesser duties, but still worked on the main line and hauling passenger services. In 1946, the locomotive was renumbered twice by Gresley's successor Edward Thompson, who devised a comprehensive renumbering scheme for the LNER. 4472 was initially assigned number 502 in January, but an amendment to the system led to its renumbering of 103 four months later. Following the nationalisation of Britain's railways on 1 January 1948, almost all of the LNER locomotive numbers were increased by 60000, and 103 became 60103 that December. On 4 June 1950, now under British Railways ownership, Flying Scotsman was allocated to its new base at Leicester Central on the Great Central Railway, running passenger services to and from London Marylebone, Leicester, Sheffield, and Manchester. It returned to the East Coast Main Line in 1953, initially based in Grantham for several months before returning to London King's Cross in April 1954, where it remained until its withdrawal in 1963.

In 1962, British Railways announced that it would scrap Flying Scotsman. No. 60103 ended service with its last scheduled run on 14 January 1963, with Jack Peckston of Copley Hill running the 13:15 from London King's Cross to Leeds, with the locomotive coming off at Doncaster.

Preservation

Alan Pegler (1963–1972)

After a previous failed attempt by the Gresley A3 Preservation Society to raise the required £3,000 to buy Flying Scotsman, businessman and railway enthusiast Alan Pegler stepped in. He first saw the locomotive at the British Empire Exhibition in 1924, and received £70,000 in 1961 for his shareholding in the Northern Rubber Company when it was sold to Pegler's Valves, a company started by his grandfather. In 1963, after 18 months of negotiations with British Railways, Pegler bought the locomotive for £3,500 with the political support of Prime Minister Harold Wilson. He spent large amounts of money restoring the locomotive at Doncaster Works as closely as possible to its LNER condition: it was repainted in its LNER livery; the smoke deflectors were removed; the double chimney replaced by a single; and its standard tender was replaced with a corridor type that the locomotive had run with between 1928 and 1936.

Pegler's contract with British Railways allowed him to run Flying Scotsman on enthusiasts' specials until 31 December 1971; for a time it was the only steam locomotive running on the British mainline. Its first public run was from London Paddington to Ruabon, Wales and back on 10 April 1963, where over 8,000 people came out to see the locomotive at Birmingham. In the following year, Pegler had the engine stand on the Forth Bridge for several days while it was sketched for a portrait by Terence Cuneo. On 13 November 1965, Flying Scotsman claimed the fastest steam hauled run between London Paddington and Cardiff, working the Panda Pullman. It also set the fastest run on the return journey. By the end of 1965, Flying Scotsman had recouped the £3,000 it cost Pegler to buy it. As watering facilities for steam locomotives were disappearing, in September 1966 Pegler spent £1,000 on a second corridor tender which was adapted as an auxiliary water tank for a further £6,000 and coupled behind the first tender. This allowed the engine to operate with a total water capacity of around 11,000 gallons. Boiler and cylinder parts from Flying Scotsman scrapped sister engine, 60041 Salmon Trout were also purchased. In May 1968, the locomotive completed a non-stop London to Edinburgh run, marking the 40th anniversary of the inaugural non-stop Flying Scotsman service and the year steam traction officially ended on British Railways. A non-stop return journey was made three days later.

Following an overhaul on the locomotive in the winter of 1968–69, Wilson's government agreed to support Pegler running Flying Scotsman in the United States and Canada to support British exports. To comply with local railway regulations it was fitted with a cowcatcher, bell, buckeye couplers, American-style whistle, air brakes, and high-intensity headlamp. The tour began on 8 October 1969 with a run from Boston, Massachusetts to Atlanta, Georgia via New York City and Washington, D.C., and continued to Slaton, Texas during the winter. Despite the successful start, the tour ran into problems as strict anti-steam laws in some states deemed the engine a fire hazard or required the engine to be towed by a diesel or electric locomotive. None of the trips on the tour carried paying passengers as it was declared illegal to do so.

While in San Francisco, Flying Scotsman ran a series of passenger trips on the San Francisco Belt Railroad and was put on show at Fisherman's Wharf. Although a commercial success at first, Pegler was £132,000 in debt by the end of 1971 and declared himself bankrupt in the following year, leaving Flying Scotsman stranded in the US. He arranged for the engine to be kept in storage at the US Army Sharpe Depot in Lathrop, California to keep it from unpaid creditors. Pegler worked his passage home from San Francisco to England on a P&O cruise ship, and began a new career giving lectures about trains and travel in addition to being chairman of the Ffestiniog Railway.

William McAlpine (1973–1995)

Amid fears of the engine's future, horticulturist and steam enthusiast Alan Bloom phoned businessman William McAlpine in January 1973 in an attempt to save it. McAlpine agreed and dealt with the attorneys, paid the creditors, and bought the locomotive. Flying Scotsman was shipped back to England via the Panama Canal in the following month. Upon arrival at Liverpool, the engine travelled to Derby under its own steam with the route lined with crowds. McAlpine paid for its restoration at Derby Works and two subsequent overhauls in the 23 years that he owned and ran it.

Trial runs took place on the Paignton and Dartmouth Steam Railway, of which McAlpine was chairman, in summer 1973, after which it was transferred to Steamtown in Carnforth, from where it steamed on regular tours. In December 1977, Flying Scotsman entered the Vickers Engineering Works in Barrow-in-Furness for heavy repairs, including an unused replacement boiler. In 1986, McAlpine leased a former diesel locomotive maintenance shop at Southall Railway Centre, which became the new base for Flying Scotsman until 2004.

In October 1988, at the invitation of the Australian Government, Flying Scotsman arrived in Australia to take part in the country's bicentenary celebrations as a central attraction in the Aus Steam '88 festival. The event organisers had been interested in having LNER A4 No 4468 Mallard visit, but it was unavailable due to the 50th anniversary of its world record high-speed run, and 4472 was recommended as its replacement. Whilst in Australia, it was operated by 3801 Limited (now East Coast Heritage Rail), and was often seen working with Locomotive 3801.

Other highlights included Flying Scotsman double-heading with New South Wales Government Railways Pacific locomotive 3801, a triple-parallel run alongside broad gauge Victorian Railways R class locomotives, and parallel runs alongside South Australian Railways locomotives 520 and 621. Its visit to Perth saw a reunion with GWR 4073 Class Pendennis Castle, which had been exhibited alongside Flying Scotsman at the 1924 British Empire Exhibition. On 8 August 1989 Flying Scotsman set another record en route to Alice Springs from Melbourne, travelling  from Parkes to Broken Hill non-stop, the longest such run by a steam locomotive ever recorded. The same journey also saw Flying Scotsman set its own haulage record when it took a 735-ton train over the  leg between Tarcoola and Alice Springs.

Flying Scotsman returned to Britain in December 1989, where it resumed working on heritage railways and the mainline from the following May. It returned to its former British Railways condition with the refitting of the German-style smoke deflectors and double chimney, and repainted in BR Brunswick Green. In 1993, McAlpine sold Flying Scotsman to help pay off a mortgage on the locomotive. This resulted in music producer and railway enthusiast Pete Waterman to merge his railway interests with McAlpine's, and the two formed Flying Scotsman Railways with Waterman running the business side of the partnership.

In April 1995, while working on the Llangollen Railway in Wales, Flying Scotsman derailed during an empty stock movement, with all wheels coming off the track before coming to a halt. When placed back on the rails and put back into steam, smoke emerged from a crack separating the boiler and the front cab. It was deemed a total failure, and immediately withdrawn from service. In June the locomotive returned to Southall, awaiting its next major overhaul.

Tony Marchington (1996–2004)
By 1996, McAlpine and Waterman had run into financial issues and to help pay off an overdraft, McAlpine decided to put Flying Scotsman on sale. On 23 February, entrepreneur Tony Marchington, already well known in the steam preservation movement, bought the locomotive and a set of coaches for £1.5 million. He spent a further £1 million on the locomotive's subsequent overhaul to mainline condition, which lasted three years and at that point, the most extensive in its history. Its first run following the works took place on 4 July 1999, hauling The Inaugural Scotsman from London King's Cross to York. It also hauled several Venice-Simplon Orient Express Pullman trains. Marchington's time with the Flying Scotsman was the subject of the Channel 4 documentary A Steamy Affair: The Story of Flying Scotsman.

In 2002, Marchington proposed a business plan which included the construction of a Flying Scotsman Village in Edinburgh, to create revenue from associated branding. After floating on OFEX as Flying Scotsman plc in the same year, in 2003 Edinburgh City Council turned down the village plans, and in September 2003 Marchington was declared bankrupt. Flying Scotsman plc CEO Peter Butler announced losses of £474,619, and with a £1.5 million overdraft at Barclays Bank, stated that the company only had enough cash to trade until April 2004. Later the company's shares were suspended after it had failed to declare interim results.

National Railway Museum (2004–present)

In February 2004, a debt agency acting on behalf of Flying Scotsman plc announced it would hold a sealed bid auction for the locomotive, to be held on 2 April. Amid fears it could be sold into foreign hands, the National Railway Museum (NRM) in York announced it would bid, and appealed for funds. It secured a winning bid of £2.3 million, 15% higher than the second highest bidder. The bulk of the money came from a £1.8 million grant from the National Heritage Memorial Fund, with the remainder coming from £350,000 raised from public donations which was matched by businessman Richard Branson, and £70,000 raised by The Yorkshire Post newspaper. Included in the sale was a spare boiler from 1944 that Flying Scotsman carried from 1965 to 1978, spare cylinders, and a Mark 1 support coach. The locomotive arrived in York in time to be exhibited as part of the museum's Railfest in June 2004 to celebrate 200 years of rail travel.

In 2004 and 2005, Flying Scotsman intermittently hauled special trains across Great Britain, although problems with its condition soon became apparent. It failed on the delivery trip to Railfest and several times more in the following months, but the museum's engineering staff failed to spot critical faults. From September 2004 until May 2005, it sat at the NRM's workshop for a heavy intermediate repair, the intention being to improve reliability and allow operation until its general overhaul and restoration. However, by the end of 2005 the intermediate repairs failed to improve the situation and the NRM decided to proceed with the general overhaul.

2006–2016 restoration

The locomotive entered the NRM's workshops in January 2006, with the original intention to return it to Gresley's original specification and renew its boiler certificate. It was estimated that this would take one year to complete, and cost around £750,000. The works were on view for visitors at the NRM, but the engine was rapidly dismantled to such an extent that the running plate was the only component recognisable to the casual observer.

In July 2007, the museum pushed back the expected completion date by 18 months, due in part to issues with the boiler restoration. By 2009, with further problems encountered including misaligned frames and a cracked cylinder, plus rising metal prices, the museum launched the SOS ("Save Our Scotsman") appeal, seeking to raise a further £250,000 with the aim of completing the work by the end of the year. In May 2011, Flying Scotsman was unveiled on the museum's turntable, finished in wartime black LNER livery; after final tests, it was to be painted LNER apple green and have it running excursions by the summer. However, cracks were discovered in the horn blocks and further testing revealed more cracks throughout the frame assembly, leading to the replacement of the main stretcher bar, horn ties and middle cylinder motion bracket, all of which were deemed beyond repair.

In 2012, with the project still unfinished, the museum published a report examining the reasons for the delay and additional cost. It found that the museum had greatly underestimated the work required due to the poor condition of the locomotive, much of which had been missed by a rushed inspection, which produced an overly optimistic assessment which was not based on engineering realities. It also found that once the project was underway, management lacked the experience, continuity or resources to undertake such a complex task, which was also hampered by illness and recruitment issues. Although the museum had a formal contract system to manage suppliers, managers failed to implement it properly. Problems were also caused by the conflicting objectives of producing a certified mainline locomotive while retaining as many original components and assemblies as possible, and between the need to overhaul the locomotive and use it as a marketing tool for the museum. The report recommended that the NRM consider the scope, size and responsibilities of their project management and engineering functions, and their contracting policy.

Following the report, the NRM commissioned First Class Partnerships (FCP) to independently review the remaining work identified as necessary by the NRM, and make recommendations on how to proceed. In March 2013, the museum announced FCP had determined the locomotive would not return to the main line until 2015, and believed the outstanding work should be put out to external tender. Riley & Son was announced as the winning contractor, and on the same day the locomotive was moved to their workshop in order to return it to running condition no earlier than the summer of 2015. In April 2015, the boiler left the NRM to be reunited with the rest of the locomotive. Three months later, as restoration neared completion, it was estimated to have the locomotive back in service by early 2016, with new electronic equipment needed to operate on the mainline. The final cost of the restoration amounted to £4.5 million, having risen by a £300,000 estimate in the summer of 2015 due to the further necessary work and the need to meet the deadline for the return to service.

Return to service

On 8 January 2016, Flying Scotsman moved under its own steam for the first time since 2005. Following tests on the East Lancashire Railway, its inaugural mainline run was cancelled due to faulty brakes. It was rescheduled for 6 February, hauling The Winter Cumbrian Mountain Express from Carnforth to Carlisle, still wearing its 2011 wartime black livery with the number 60103 on the smokebox and its LNER wartime numbers, 103 and 502, on the cab sides. After it was repainted in BR Brunswick Green, Flying Scotsman returned to London King's Cross on 25 February with a run to York. Thousands of people lined the route, and the train was forced to stop due to members of the public trespassing on the line near St Neots.

Flying Scotsman has run on British heritage and mainline railways since its return in 2016. In October 2018, six years after Pegler's death, it hauled the Farewell Alan Pegler special from King's Cross to York, organised at the request of his daughter. In his will, Pegler requested for half of his ashes to be placed in the firebox of the locomotive as it ascended Stoke Bank. The climb was accompanied by a long blast of the whistle as passengers onboard gave a moment of silence. In January 2019, Flying Scotsman hauled the non-stop Scotsman's Salute from King's Cross to York, this time as a tribute to McAlpine following his death in March 2018.

In April 2022, the engine was withdrawn for an overhaul in preparation for its centenary year in 2023. Following the work it will be certified to run on the mainline until 2029, after which it will run solely on heritage railways until 2032. Its first engagement following restoration was to be a summer visit to the Bluebell Railway, but it was postponed and rescheduled for 2023 after a broken piston ring was discovered to have damaged a cylinder. It appeared at London King's Cross as a static display for two days to commemorate the 170th anniversary of the station's opening on 14 and 15 October 2022, followed by a return to steam for a visit to the Swanage Railway.

Centenary events

In celebration of turning 100 in February 2023, Flying Scotsman will take part in various events between March and December including static displays, runs on the mainline, and visits to heritage railways. A special 100 Years, 100 Voices exhibition will be held at the National Railway Museum. A collectable £2 coin was produced by the Royal Mint, some of which are in colour inspired by the locomotive's Apple Green livery which marked the first colour coin produced in over 20 years. Poet Laureate Simon Armitage released a new poem entitled The Making of Flying Scotsman.

On International Women's Day 2023 Flying Scotsman was, for the first time in its history, crewed by an all-female crew. The event was organised by the National Railway Museum and East Lancashire Railway as part of the centenary celebration. On the footplate were Driver Beth Furness, Route Conductor Linda Henderson, Fireman Steph Elwood, Locomotive Cleaner Charlotte Istance and the Guard was Lesley Hampson.

In popular culture

Film and television
Because of the LNER's emphasis on using the locomotive for publicity purposes, and then its eventful preservation history, including two international forays, it is one of the UK's most recognised locomotives. One of its first film appearances was in the 1929 film The Flying Scotsman, which featured an entire sequence set aboard the locomotive. Flying Scotsman is seen in Agatha (1979), disguised as two other members of the class–4474 Victor Wild on one side and 4480 Enterprise on the other. Flying Scotsman makes a short appearance in 102 Dalmatians (2000). It was filmed leaving London St Pancras, which was the final steam-hauled departure from the station prior to its reconstruction as the new Eurostar terminal.

In 1985, Flying Scotsman appeared alongside an InterCity 125 in a British Rail television advert. The locomotive was the first choice for the Top Gear Race to the North in 2009, but was unable to attend due to its overhaul. LNER Class A1 60163 Tornado was used instead. In 2011, a Tri-ang Hornby model of Flying Scotsman appeared in two episodes of James May's Toy Stories. It was James May's personal childhood model and was chosen by him to complete a world record for the longest model railway. The train was meant to travel seven miles, from Barnstaple to Bideford in North Devon, but it failed early in the trip. It completed the run on a subsequent attempt. The model reappeared in James May: The Reassembler, in which it was completely disassembled and then put back together by May as a demonstration.

In 2016, Flying Scotsman was the subject of two television documentaries. Flying Scotsman from the Footplate aired on BBC 4, and Flying Scotsman with Robson Green was broadcast on ITV. The latter features Green who spent a year with the team of engineers commissioned to restore the locomotive.

The Railway Series and Thomas & Friends
Flying Scotsman is featured in The Railway Series books by the Rev. W. Awdry. The engine visited the fictional Island of Sodor in the book Enterprising Engines to visit his only remaining brother, Gordon. Its two tenders was a key feature of the plot of "Tenders for Henry". When the story was filmed for the television series Thomas & Friends, renamed as "Tender Engines", only Flying Scotsman's two tenders were seen outside a shed. Flying Scotsman was intended to have a larger role in this episode, but due to budgetary constraints the entire model could not be constructed. 

Flying Scotsman makes a full appearance in the animated film Thomas & Friends: The Great Race (2016), where he is voiced by Rufus Jones in both the UK and US dubs. Beyond the movie, he would also appear as a recurring character.

Other
Flying Scotsman is a playable locomotive in the 2001 PC simulation game Microsoft Train Simulator.

One of the specially produced £5 coins for the 2012 Summer Olympics featured an engraving of Flying Scotsman on the back.

Flying Scotsman is featured in the 2018 racing game Forza Horizon 4, in a Showcase event in which the player must race against the engine.

Hornby Railways used Flying Scotsman as its Centenary Year edition logo.

Hornby marketed N gauge British profile locomotives made by Minitrix for several years from 1977 as ‘Hornby Minitrix’. When the agreement ended Minitrix continued for a while to make and sell British locos and 2 versions of Flying Scotsman were the last listed in catalogues. It was sold first as 60103 in BR green and crest, then later as 4472 in LNER green and lettering. The models come up for sale occasionally on eBay etc and are still good runners though designed for use on DC layouts.

References

Sources

Further reading

External links

National Railway Museum's site about Flying Scotsman train and locomotive
The official National Railway Museum print website containing many Flying Scotsman prints and posters
BBC "Nation on Film" article with historic films of Flying Scotsman in steam.
The LNER Encyclopedia page for the Gresley A1/A3s including Flying Scotsman
History of the Flying Scotsman by Southern Steam Trains
The Flying Scotsman (The Unstoppable Flying Scotsman), 2018 TV documentary

4-6-2 locomotives
Flying Scotsman
Land speed record rail vehicles
Preserved London and North Eastern Railway steam locomotives
Railway locomotives introduced in 1923